Elephant Memory Systems (EMS) was a popular brand of floppy disk media produced by Leading Edge in the 1980s.  The name for the product was suggested by Ray Welch to company owner Michael Shane because of the common folk wisdom that an elephant never forgets. Elephant was founded in 1980.

The brand was originally devised as an inexpensive, mass-market product.  Its imposing pachyderm logo, designed by Rollin Binzer was often paired with bright orange or yellow and black packaging, which was in stark contrast of the more conservative silvers and blues used by competitors like IBM.  Shane's advisers feared this would undermine the credibility of the product.  However, Elephant eventually became viewed as a premium product, eventually becoming one of the highest-margin floppies on  the market and one of the best-selling media brands in history.  

Leading Edge sold the computer aftermarket division to Dennison Computer Supplies, a division of Dennison Manufacturing (now Avery Dennison) and retained the computer hardware division.  The EMS market was primarily students and home enthusiasts. EMS was not typically utilized in business settings.  Competitors Dysan and Verbatim dominated this end of the market.  Dennison tried to compete in the corporate market by developing a brand of the Elephant diskette called "Silver."  A television commercial was filmed in New York City featuring stampeding elephants to announce this new premium line.

Leading Edge was acquired in 1989 by Daewoo, one of its hardware suppliers, after filing for Chapter 11 bankruptcy.

References

External links
 Logo Artist

American companies established in 1980
American companies disestablished in 1989
Computer companies established in 1980
Computer companies disestablished in 1989
Defunct computer companies of the United States